The 51st edition of the Tirreno–Adriatico cycling stage race was held from 9 to 15 March 2016. It was the third event of the 2016 UCI World Tour.

Route

The route for the 2016 Tirreno–Adriatico was announced in December 2015 in Camaiore, where the race starts. The first stage is a  team time trial on the coast. The second – and first road stage – finishes on a short climb, suiting classics riders. The third and fourth stages have flat finishes, favouring sprinters. The fifth stage is the queen stage of the race: it features five categorised climbs, finishing with the  ascent of Monte San Vicino. The sixth stage again suits sprinters. The race finishes in San Benedetto del Tronto for the fiftieth consecutive year with a  individual time trial to decide the final standings.

Participating teams
As Tirreno–Adriatico is a UCI World Tour event, all eighteen UCI Pro Teams were invited automatically and obliged to enter a team into the race. Five other teams were given wild cards to enter the race. All teams sent the allowed number of riders, eight, totaling 184 riders.

Stages

Stage 1

9 March 2016 – Lido di Camaiore,  (TTT)

Stage 2
10 March 2016 — Camaiore to Pomarance,

Stage 3
11 March 2016 — Castelnuovo Val di Cecina to Montalto di Castro,

Stage 4
12 March 2016 — Montalto di Castro to Foligno,

Stage 5
13 March 2016 — Foligno to Monte San Vicino, 

Stage cancelled due to snow.

Stage 6
14 March 2016 — Castelraimondo to Cepagatti,

Stage 7
15 March 2016 — San Benedetto del Tronto,

Classification leadership table

Notes

References

External links
 

Tirreno–Adriatico
Tirreno-Adriatico
2016 in Italian sport